Dyer station is an Amtrak station in Dyer, Indiana, served by the Cardinal route.

Dyer Station was merely a little shelter with seats before a renovation in 2014, which demolished the "Amshack" shelter built in 1986 and constructed a larger station house which was ADA accessible, and repaved the platform and parking lot. It is located north of an at-grade crossing of two railroad lines; CSX (formerly the Monon Railroad) and the Elgin, Joliet & Eastern. The original depot stood at the diamond junction itself.

Connections 
On August 2, 2010, Northwest Indiana Regional Bus Authority revamped the Hammond Transit System into EasyGo Lake Transit. The newly introduced Red Route terminated approximately a mile northeast of the station, at Main/Calumet intersection. Riders could take the Red Route to Munster, Hammond and Chicago's East Side neighborhood. They could also transfer to other EasyGo routes and connect to other towns and cities throughout Lake Country.

Hammond Transit and EasyGo Lake Transit discontinued all service on June 30, 2012.

The Northern Indiana Commuter Transportation District (NICTD) had proposed a line to Lowell, Indiana which ran adjacent to the station, but Dyer's Amtrak station is not a planned stop.

Notes

References

External links 

Dyer Amtrak Station (USA Rail Guide -- Train Web)

Amtrak stations in Indiana
Railway stations in Lake County, Indiana
Railway stations in the United States opened in 1986